Kurt Masur (18 July 1927 – 19 December 2015) was a German conductor. Called "one of the last old-style maestros", he directed many of the principal orchestras of his era. He had a long career as the Kapellmeister of the Leipzig Gewandhaus Orchestra, and also served as music director of the New York Philharmonic. He left many recordings of classical music played by major orchestras. Masur is also remembered for his actions to support peaceful demonstrations in the 1989 anti-government demonstrations in Leipzig; the protests were part of the events leading up to the fall of the Berlin wall.

Biography

Masur was born in Brieg, Lower Silesia, Germany (now Brzeg, Poland), and studied piano, composition and conducting in Leipzig, Saxony.
His father was an electrical engineer, and as a young boy he completed an electrician's apprenticeship; he occasionally worked in his father's shop. From ages 10 to 16, he took piano lessons with Katharina Hartmann.

In October 1944 the Nazis announced that all men between the ages of 16 and 60 could be conscripted, which included the young conductor. Masur was drafted into the paratroopers late in 1944. He was sent to fight; "[o]ut of the 150 people of his unit, only 27 [including Masur] survived", before being captured by American and British forces on 1 May 1945. Masur and his family were lucky: not a single family member died in the war.

From 1946 until 1948, he studied conducting, composition and piano at the University of Music and Theatre Leipzig. He left at 21, never finishing his studies, when offered a job as répétiteur at the Landestheater Halle an der Saale (since renamed as the Halle Opera House, or Opernhaus Halle in German).

Masur was married three times, and had a total of five children. His first marriage to Brigitte Stütze produced three children, and it ended in divorce in 1966. He and his second wife, Irmgard Elsa Kaul, had a daughter, Carolin Masur, who became an opera singer. Irmgard died in 1972 in a car accident in which Masur was severely injured. In 1975, he married his third wife, soprano and violist, Tomoko Sakurai: they had one son, Ken-David, a classical singer and conductor.

Conducting career
Masur conducted the Dresden Philharmonic for three years ending in 1958 and again from 1967 to 1972. He also worked with the Komische Oper of East Berlin. In 1970, he became Kapellmeister of the Gewandhausorchester Leipzig, serving in that post until 1996.  With that orchestra, he performed Beethoven's Ninth Symphony at the celebration of German reunification in 1990.

In 1991, Masur became music director of the New York Philharmonic (NYP). He was an unexpected choice who brought needed change to that orchestra. "Masur's appointment was a clear signal that it was time for the orchestra to begin anew." Former concertmaster Glenn Dicterow said in 2012 "It takes a big personality to unite 105 players onstage — to get everybody to be as inspired as he is — and, uh, it's hard work, . . And he's just so demanding and intense that I think that he got, just by his sheer intensity of his personality, I think it sort of transformed most of us." Masur directed the Philharmonic in a performance of Brahms's Ein deutsches Requiem in the aftermath of the terrorist attacks on 11 September 2001. During his tenure, there were reports of tension between Masur and the NYP's Executive Director at the time, Deborah Borda, which eventually contributed to his contract not being renewed beyond 2002. In a television interview with Charlie Rose, Masur stated that regarding his leaving the NYP, "it was not my wish".  Masur stood down as the NYP's music director in 2002 and was named its Music Director Emeritus, a new title created for him. The critical consensus was that Masur improved the playing of the orchestra over his tenure.

In 2000, Masur became principal conductor of the London Philharmonic Orchestra (LPO) and held this position until 2007. In April 2002, Masur became music director of the Orchestre National de France (ONF) and served in this post until 2008, when he took the title of honorary music director of the ONF. On his 80th birthday, 18 July 2007, Masur conducted musicians from both orchestras at a Proms concert in London. Masur held the lifetime title of Honorary Guest Conductor of the Israel Philharmonic Orchestra. In 2012, following a series of cancellations of concert engagements, Masur disclosed on his website that he had Parkinson's disease.

Political views
Although Masur spent most of his professional career in East Germany, he never joined the SED. In 1982, he received the National Prize of East Germany. His attitude to the regime began to change in 1989, after the arrest of a street musician in Leipzig. On 9 October 1989, he intervened in anti-government demonstrations in Leipzig in communist East Germany, negotiating an end to a confrontation that could have resulted in security forces attacking the protesters, one month before the fall of the Berlin wall.

Death
In 2015, Masur died at the age of 88 in Greenwich, Connecticut, from complications of Parkinson's disease. His funeral was held in the Thomaskirche in Leipzig, with music played by the Leipzig Gewandhaus Orchestra and the Thomanerchor. Burial took place in the South Leipzig Cemetery, called Südfriedhof. He was survived by his third wife, as well as his daughters Angelika and Carolin, his sons, Ken-David, Michael and Matthias, and nine grandchildren.

Awards

A professor at the Leipzig Academy of Music since 1975, Masur received numerous honors. In 1995, he received the Cross of the Order of Merit of the Federal Republic of Germany. He received the Gold Medal of Honor for Music from the National Arts Club in 1996. in 1997 he received the titles of Commander of the Legion of Honor from the French government (Chevalier de la Légion d'honneur), and New York City Cultural Ambassador from the City of New York. In 1999 he received the Commander Cross of Merit of the Polish Republic.

In 2002, President of Germany Johannes Rau awarded him the Cross with Star of the Order of Merit of the Federal Republic of Germany; in 2007, President of Germany Horst Köhler bestowed upon him the Grand Cross of the Order of Merit with Star and Ribbon; in 2008, he received the Wilhelm Furtwängler Prize in Bonn, Germany. Masur was also an Honorary Citizen of his hometown Brieg. In 2001, Masur became an Honorary Member of the Royal Academy of Music.

In 2010, he received the Leo Baeck Medal (Leo Baeck Institute) for his humanitarian work promoting tolerance and social justice. He received a  Award in 2014 for his work in public policy.

On 18 July 2018, which would have been Masur's 91st birthday, Google featured him in a Google Doodle in the United States, Germany, Belarus, Iceland, and Japan.

References

External links

 
 Discography of Kurt Masur
 
 
 
 Interview with Kurt Masur, 8 June 1988
 Leo Baeck Institute, "Leo Baeck Medal for Kurt Masur", 10 November 2010

1927 births
2015 deaths
German male conductors (music)
Music directors of the New York Philharmonic
20th-century German conductors (music)
20th-century German male musicians
21st-century German conductors (music)
21st-century German male musicians
University of Music and Theatre Leipzig alumni
Academic staff of the University of Music and Theatre Leipzig
Commanders of the Order of Merit of the Republic of Poland
Grand Officiers of the Légion d'honneur
Grand Crosses with Star and Sash of the Order of Merit of the Federal Republic of Germany
Recipients of the Order of Merit of the Free State of Saxony
Honorary Members of the Royal Academy of Music
Members of the Academy of Arts, Berlin
Recipients of the National Prize of East Germany
People from the Province of Lower Silesia
People from Brzeg
20th-century male musicians
Fallschirmjäger of World War II
German prisoners of war in World War II held by the United States
German prisoners of war in World War II held by the United Kingdom